Pam Shriver was the defending champion but lost in the semifinals to Barbara Potter.

Lori McNeil won in the final 6–4, 4–6, 6–3 against Potter.

Seeds
A champion seed is indicated in bold text while text in italics indicates the round in which that seed was eliminated.

  Pam Shriver (semifinals)
  Lori McNeil (champion)
  Barbara Potter (final)
  Rosalyn Fairbank (semifinals)
  Robin White (quarterfinals)
  Gigi Fernández (second round)
  Gretchen Magers (second round)
  Wendy Turnbull (first round)

Draw

References
 1988 Virginia Slims of Newport Draw

Virginia Slims of Newport
1988 WTA Tour
1988 Hall of Fame Tennis Championships